Businessmen & Ghosts is a double album by British band Working for a Nuclear Free City. The album is Working for a Nuclear Free City's U.S. debut album.

The double disc set includes their self-titled first album as well as the majority of their Rocket EP (lacking only one of the four tracks, "Waiting Game"), both previously UK-only releases.

Track listing

All songs written by Phil Kay (credited simply as "Dekko"), Gary McClure, Ed Hulme, Jon Kay.

Disc One
 "224th Day" – 1:42
 "Troubled Son" – 2:49
 "Dead Fingers Talking" – 3:29
 "Rocket" – 4:47
 "Kingdom" – 4:06
 "Sarah Dreams of Summer" – 3:22
 "Apron Strings" – 3:56
 "All American Taste" – 3:06
 "Quiet Place" – 4:33
 "So" – 3:57
 "England" – 7:24
 "Over" – 3:44
 "Fallout" – 1:53
 "Forever" – 4:35
 "Stone Cold" – 3:27

Disc Two
 "Eighty Eight" – 3:37
 "Donkey" – 4:08
 "Get a Fucking Haircut" – 1:37
 "Innocence" – 4:18
 "Home" – 1:17
 "Heaven Kissing Hill" – 4:24
 "The Tape" – 2:58
 "Asleep at the Wheel" – 4:20
 "Pretty Police State" – 1:08
 "Soft Touch" – 6:32
 "Pixelated Birds" – 1:39
 "Je suis le vent" – 3:03
 "Nancy Adam Susan" – 5:58
 "The Tree" – 2:32

References

2008 albums
Working for a Nuclear Free City albums